The 1966 Ohio State Buckeyes football team represented the Ohio State University in the 1966 Big Ten Conference football season. The Buckeyes compiled a 4–5 record.

Schedule

Coaching staff
 Woody Hayes – Head Coach – 16th year

Game summaries

TCU

Washington

Illinois

Michigan State

Wisconsin

Minnesota

Indiana

Iowa

Michigan

1967 NFL draftees

References

Ohio State
Ohio State Buckeyes football seasons
Ohio State Buckeyes football